Ysabel MacCloskey (January 20, 1915 – March 11, 1981) was an American stage, film and television character actress.

She began her show business career after graduating from the University of California at Berkeley, where she performed in several productions at the Pasadena Playhouse. She was an original member of the American Conservatory Theater in San Francisco and later joined an opera company in Stuttgart, West Germany, where her husband was stationed.

Filmography

The Beverly Hillbillies (1968, TV Series) - Mrs. Vanderpont
Yours, Mine and Ours (1968) - Housekeeper #1
Star! (1968) - Guest in Gertie's Dressing Room (uncredited)
Hawaii Five-O (1968, TV Series) - Landlady
Green Acres (1969, TV Series) - Farm Woman
Bewitched (1971, TV Series) - Aunt Hagatha / Martha Jameson / Mrs. Rockfield
The Brotherhood of Satan (1971) - Witch
Bedknobs and Broomsticks (1971) - Mrs. Jayne Mason (uncredited)
Temperatures Rising (1972, TV Series) - Mrs. Right
Bridget Loves Bernie (1972, TV Series) - Mother Superior
The Waltons (1974, TV Series) - Mrs. Riddle
The Streets of San Francisco (1973-1974, TV Series) - Martha / Mrs. Davenport / Ysabel, the maid
The Practice (1976, TV Series) - Mrs. Brickman
Corey: For the People (1977, TV Movie) - Mollie Schultz
Poco... Little Dog Lost (1977) - Poco
Deadly Game (1977, TV Movie) - Emma
Loose Shoes (1978) - Ma Kettle
Mork & Mindy (1978, TV Series) - The Woman
Little House on the Prairie (1979, TV Series) - Widow Mumford
The Power Within (1979, TV Movie) Grandma
Benson  (1980, TV Series) - Nurse Platt
Terror Among Us (1981, TV Movie) - Mrs. Shaw (final appearance)

References

External links

Profile TV.com; accessed November 16, 2015. 
Profile, oscars.org; accessed November 16, 2015.

1915 births
1981 deaths
American film actresses
American stage actresses
American television actresses
Actresses from Washington (state)
20th-century American actresses
Place of birth missing
University of California, Berkeley people